Towaco is an unincorporated community located within Montville Township in Morris County, New Jersey, United States. The area is served as United States Postal Service ZIP code 07082. Its name reflects the Native American history in the area, which identified the locale as TaWagh, meaning "hill", a reference to the terrain of Towaco.

The Towaco station offers NJ Transit rail service along the Montclair-Boonton Line. It essentially replaced the abandoned Montville station. The train station has been renovated.

Demographics

As of the 2010 United States Census, the population for ZIP Code Tabulation Area 07082 was 5,384.

Economy 
In Towaco is a location of the leading manufacturer of machines and plants for the foam industry. This American location is called Baumer of America, Inc. and is one of the biggest employers of the city.

Sea Breeze, maker of Bosco Chocolate Syrup and beverage concentrates for the foodservice trade, is located in Towaco.

Notable people

People who were born in, residents of, or otherwise closely associated with Towaco include:
 Ulric Ellerhusen (1879–1957), sculptor best known for his works of architectural sculpture.
Teresa and Joe Giudice, reality TV personalities of Bravo TV's Real Housewives of New Jersey.
 James P. Vreeland (1910–2001), politician who served four terms in the New Jersey Senate after a term in the New Jersey General Assembly.

References

Montville, New Jersey
Unincorporated communities in Morris County, New Jersey
Unincorporated communities in New Jersey